Tephrosia glomeruliflora, or pink tephrosia, is a perennial (non-climbing) herb in the family Fabaceae, endemic to South Africa (native to  Zimbabwe, South Africa and Eswatini). It is also found on the eastern coast of Australia, in New South Wales and Queensland, where it is considered an environmental weed.

Description
Tephrosia glomeruliflora is an erect shrub growing to 1–2 m high. Its branches are  hairy with the hairs lying close to the branch.
The pinnate leaves are 5–12 cm long; and there are 11-21 leaflets which are 15–40 mm long and  5–10 mm wide with an obtuse apex finishing in a tiny sharp point. The upper surface of the leaflets is sparsely hairy with the hairs pressed close to the leaflet, and the lower surface is silky-hairy. The petiole is 10–20 mm long. The stipules are ovate and  6–10 mm long.
It flowers in terminal racemes, with clusters of buds enclosed on broad bracts. The calyx is silvery (from the hairs) and  4–5 mm long,  with teeth which are 1–1.5 mm long. The corolla is 15–20 mm long and  pink to mauve.
The pod is  5–7 cm long and 7–9 mm wide, and smooth except for the hairy sutures.

Etymology
The genus name, Tephrosia, derives from the Greek tephros (ash-coloured) and refers to the fact that most of the species are covered with grey hairs. The species epithet, glomeruliflora, derives from the Latin, glomerulus, (clusters of flowers subtended by a bract), and flos (flower).

Habitat
In Africa, it grows in grasslands.

References

External links
 Occurrence data from GBIF for Tephrosia glomeruliflora
Plants of the world online: Tephrosia glomeruliflora. (gives an overview)
Shows specimens of Tephrosia glomeruliflora.

glomeruliflora
Flora of South Africa
Flora of Zimbabwe
Taxa named by Carl Meissner
Plants described in 1843